Christophe Boltanski (born 10 July 1962) is a French journalist, writer and chronicler, laureate of the prix Femina 2015 for his novel La Cache.

Biography 
Christophe Boltanski is the son of sociologist Luc Boltanski and the nephew of linguist Jean-Élie Boltanski and visual artist Christian Boltanski.

Since 2007 he has been working for the weekly Le Nouvel Observateur, while collaborating on the website Rue 89.

In 2000 he was awarded the Prix Bayeux-Calvados des correspondants de guerre for a report on a mine in Congo, in the Nord-Kivu region: "Les Mineurs de l'enfer".

Works 
Essais
 Les Sept Vies de Yasser Arafat, Grasset, 1997 
 Chirac d'Arabie (Les Mirages d'une politique française) (with Éric Aeschimann), Grasset, 2006 
 Minerais de sang : Les esclaves du monde moderne, coll. Folio, 2014 , Grasset, 2012 , photographs by Patrick Robert

Novel
 La Cache, Stock, collection bleue, 2015 . – Prix Femina and  2015

References 

1962 births
People from Boulogne-Billancourt
20th-century French journalists
21st-century French journalists
20th-century French writers
20th-century French male writers
21st-century French writers
French war correspondents
Prix Femina winners
Living people
French male non-fiction writers